= Mike Peng Li =

American engineer

Mike Peng Li is an electrical engineer with the Intel Corporation in San Jose, California. He was named a Fellow of the Institute of Electrical and Electronics Engineers (IEEE) in 2012 for his contributions to the design of jitter test technologies.
